Steeve Ho You Fat (born 12 June 1988) is a French professional basketball player who plays for Metropolitans 92 in LNB Pro A. 

He was born in French Guiana, where the Ho You Fat's family business controls shipping at the port of Cayenne; his paternal grandfather was an immigrant from China. Ho You Fat began his basketball career with Cholet Basketball in 2008. He enjoyed his best season in 2018–19, when he averaged 15.6 points per game for ALM Évreux Basket  in LNB Pro B.

References

External links
Profile at Eurobasket.com
Profile at Proballers.com

1988 births
Living people
ALM Évreux Basket players
BC Orchies players
Cholet Basket players
Chorale Roanne Basket players
French Guianan basketball players
French people of Chinese descent
Olympique Antibes basketball players
Metropolitans 92 players
Sportspeople from Cayenne